Ádám Szepesi (born 12 April 1945) is a retired Hungarian high jumper.

He was born in Békéscsaba. He finished fifth at the 1972 Summer Olympics with a jump of 2.18 metres. He became Hungarian high jump champion in 1972, rivalling with Endre Kelemen and István Major.

His personal best jump was 2.21 metres, achieved in 1972.

References

Hungarian male high jumpers
Athletes (track and field) at the 1972 Summer Olympics
Olympic athletes of Hungary
1945 births
Living people
People from Békéscsaba
Sportspeople from Békés County
20th-century Hungarian people